Uri D. Herscher (born March 14, 1941) is an American rabbi  and academic, the founder of the Skirball Cultural Center in Los Angeles.

Early life and education
Born in Tel Aviv to parents who fled Germany in the mid-1930s, in 1954, he immigrated with his parents and brother to the United States where they settled in San Jose, California.  After high school, he enrolled at the University of California, Berkeley, where he graduated   in 1964 with a BA in history and sociology. During his undergraduate years he founded Cal Camp, a summer camp which continues to serve underprivileged children in the San Francisco Bay Area. Seeking donated clothing for the children, he met Robert D. Haas, a classmate and scion of the Levi Strauss family, noted for its philanthropy; this   friendship     proved instrumental to his later endeavors.

Though not religious, his interest in Jewish culture caused him to attend   Hebrew Union College-Jewish Institute of Religion, a Reform seminary. He was ordained a Rabbi there in 1970. After that, while working in an administrative position at the College-Institute, he pursued a doctorate in American Jewish history under the guidance of Stanley F. Chyet, a protégé of Jacob Rader Marcus.

Herscher's dissertation, on utopian farm colonies established by American Jewish immigrants in the 1880s, was eventually published, followed by several other immigration studies including, On Jews, American and Immigration (American Jewish Archives), Jewish Agricultural Utopias in America (Wayne State University Press), A Century of Memories, 1882–1982: The Eastern European Experience in America (American Jewish Archives), and Queen City Refuge (Behrman House).  His articles and reviews have appeared in more than thirty academic journals devoted to ethnic studies, sociology, and Jewish history and religion.

In 1975 he was appointed professor of American Jewish history and executive vice president and dean of the faculty of the College-Institute, overseeing its campuses in Cincinnati, Los Angeles, New York, and Jerusalem.

Skirball Cultural Center
In 1979, Herscher moved his office from Cincinnati to Los Angeles, then emerging as the second largest Jewish community in the U.S.   Recognizing that the vast majority of Jews were unaffiliated and increasingly indifferent to Jewish concerns, and acknowledging "the failure of existing institutions to speak meaningfully" to them, he envisioned a new strategy of communal outreach and engagement:  the creation of a cultural center that would focus on the American Jewish experience.  The center would house the College-Institute's Skirball Museum, with a  significant collection of artifacts and  venues for public lectures, performing arts, and educational activities for children and families.
	
Jack H. Skirball's foundation provided the seed funding, the College-Institute approved the project in 1981, on the condition that Herscher secure the funds himself.  Over the next decade, with help from key supporters such as Skirball, Los Angeles Times Chairman Franklin Murphy, and the Levi Strauss family of San Francisco, he  raised the money  from both Jewish and non-Jewish benefactors.  A fifteen-acre site was acquired in the Santa Monica mountains, and   Israeli-American architect Moshe Safdie was engaged to design the campus.  In 1996 the Skirball Cultural Center, separately incorporated, opened to the public, with Herscher as founding president and chief executive. The Center attracted some 300,000 visitors in its first year,  and an ambitious expansion of its facilities, programs, and endowment ensued.  By 2005, it had become one of the world's major Jewish cultural institutions.

In 2009 Newsweek named him # 9 on its list of "50 Influential Rabbis."

Herscher holds honorary degrees from the University of Southern California and the University of Judaism, and recently completed his five-year term as one of five commissioners on the Los Angeles City Ethics Commission.

He and his wife, Dr. Myna Herscher, have four sons.

References

External links
www.skirball.org

Living people
1941 births
20th-century American rabbis
21st-century American rabbis